Canavese (French: Canavais; Piedmontese: Canavèis) is a subalpine geographical and historical area of North-West Italy which lies today within the Metropolitan City of Turin in Piedmont. Its main town is Ivrea and it is famous for its castles.

Location
To the North it borders on the Aosta Valley and to the East on the provinces of Biella and Vercelli. To the South and West the borders have varied over time but might be taken as being the rivers Stura di Lanzo and Po. The valley of the river Orco and the area around Corio fall within the Canavese. Turin, however, is entirely excluded.

The main centres, in addition to Ivrea, are  Caluso, Chivasso, Cirié, Cuorgnè and Rivarolo Canavese.

List of places in Canavese

 Agliè
 Albiano d'Ivrea
 Alpette
 Andrate
 Azeglio
 Bairo
 Baldissero Canavese
 Banchette
 Barbania
 Barone Canavese
 Bollengo
 Borgiallo
 Borgofranco d'Ivrea
 Borgomasino
 Bosconero
 Brandizzo
 Brosso
 Burolo
 Busano
 Caluso
 Candia Canavese
 Canischio
 Caravino
 Carema
 Cascinette d'Ivrea
 Castellamonte
 Castelnuovo Nigra
 Ceresole Reale
 Chiaverano
 Chiesanuova
 Chivasso
 Ciconio
 Cintano
 Cirié
 Colleretto Castelnuovo
 Colleretto Giacosa
 Corio
 Cossano Canavese
 Cuceglio
 Cuorgnè
 Favria
 Feletto
 Fiorano Canavese
 Foglizzo
 Forno Canavese
 Frassinetto
 Front
 Grosso
 Ingria
 Issiglio
 Ivrea
 Leinì
 Lessolo
 Levone
 Locana
 Lombardore
 Loranzè
 Lusigliè
 Maglione
 Mathi
 Mazzè
 Mercenasco
 Moncrivello
 Montalenghe
 Montalto Dora
 Montanaro
 Noasca
 Nole
 Nomaglio
 Oglianico
 Orio Canavese
 Ozegna
 Palazzo Canavese
 Parella
 Pavone Canavese
 Perosa Canavese
 Pertusio
 Piverone
 Pont Canavese
 Prascorsano
 Pratiglione
 Quagliuzzo
 Quassolo
 Quincinetto
 Ribordone
 Rivara
 Rivarolo Canavese
 Rivarossa
 Rocca Canavese
 Romano Canavese
 Ronco Canavese
 Rondissone
 Roppolo
 Rueglio
 Salassa
 Salerano Canavese
 Samone
 San Benigno Canavese
 San Carlo Canavese
 San Colombano Belmonte
 San Francesco al Campo
 San Giorgio Canavese
 San Giusto Canavese
 San Martino Canavese
 San Maurizio Canavese
 San Ponso
 Scarmagno
 Settimo Rottaro
 Settimo Vittone
 Sparone
 Strambinello
 Strambino
 Tavagnasco
 Torrazza Piemonte
 Torre Canavese
 Traversella
 Valchiusa
 Val di Chy
 Valperga
 Valprato Soana
 Vauda Canavese
 Verolengo
 Vestignè
 Vialfrè
 Vidracco
 Villanova Canavese
 Villareggia
 Vische
 Vistrorio
 Viverone
 Volpiano

History
The first inhabitants of Canavese were the Salassi, a tribe of Celto-Ligurian roots; the Romans arrived in 22 BCE.

When the Roman Empire fell, Canavese fell under the domination of Byzantium. It was then conquered by Lombards and later by Franks.

After the death of Arduino, marquis of Ivrea and the first to bear the title of king of Italy (1015), the Counts of Canavese part of the House of Ivrea   (who all claimed to be his descendants) shared out the region. This was the beginning of the big families of Canavese: San Martino, Valperga, de Candia, Castellamonte, and later the Biandrate family from Novara.

The House of Savoy started its political expansion in Canavese in the 14th century, and the Commune of Ivrea as well as the Canavese Counts became their subjects.

In the 16th century, Canavese came under French domination, then Spanish domination, then back to French domination. Napoleon's defeat in 1814 returned Canavese under the House of Savoy.

Main sights
Sacro Monte di Belmonte
House of King Arduin at Cuorgnè
Cathedral and Church of St. Bernardino at Ivrea
Fruttuaria Abbey

Canavese is also home to numerous castles of medieval origin, such as those of Ivrea, Parella, Malgrà, Agliè and others.

References

External links

CORSAC (Centro Ricerche e Studi Alto Canavese) 
Official web site for European Sacred Mounts 

 
Metropolitan City of Turin
Geographical, historical and cultural regions of Piedmont